The Bankruptcy Act of 1800 was the first piece of federal legislation in the United States surrounding bankruptcy. The act was passed in response to a decade of periodic financial crises and commercial failures. It was modeled after English practice. The act placed the bankrupt estate under the control of a commissioner chosen by the district judge. The debt would be forgiven if two-thirds of creditors (by both number and dollar amount) agreed to forgive the remaining debt. Only merchants could petition a creditor to file a case under the provisions of the act. 

Before independence, bankruptcy law in the Thirteen Colonies followed English common law. After multiple wars, including the Seven Years' War and the American Revolutionary War, debt became more common not only at a national level but also in personal affairs. With this change came a shift in perspective surrounding debt. Instead of viewing it as a moral flaw, as English policy did, it became known as bad luck or a result of unfortunate events. By setting up a separate system for debtors and creditors, the United States attempted to curb the number of bankrupt citizens being put in jail. The act was meant as a temporary measure with a five-year sunset clause. Congress repealed the act in 1803.

English policy in the Thirteen Colonies
Prior to independence, policies concerning bankruptcy in the Thirteen Colonies followed English common law. In the late eighteenth century, bankruptcy was seen as a moral failure in England. People were expected to keep their affairs in order and any deviance from upright economic standing was considered a personal fault. Individuals who were unable to pay back their debts had their property confiscated and assigned to the creditor, or were imprisoned.

United States policy before the act
In the years following American independence, the nation accrued significant debt as a result of the Seven Years' War and the American Revolutionary War. The national debt destabilized the economy and resulted in higher debts for private citizens. As debt became more common, the nation did not abandon English practice, though it was often modified in the arrangements between debtors and creditors.

Policy changes
The act provided for creditors to file bankruptcy against those who could not pay their debts. Once filed, bankruptcy cases were sent to district judges who would pick specific administrators separate from themselves to look over the cases and help facilitate the payments and legal ramifications. The debt would be forgiven if two-thirds of the creditors, in both number and amount owed, agreed to forgive the remaining debt. This system was intended to help individuals manage their debt and have a middle man to keep creditors from hastily throwing their debtors in jail. This system was not available to all people; during the three years that this act was used, only merchants were eligible to have creditors forgive their debt in this fashion.

Repeal of the act
Many of the commissioners appointed to oversee the bankruptcies did not keep track of all the information. When President James Monroe asked for a report on how this act had played out, many reported that they had either not kept their paperwork in order or did not have any to begin with. This allowed for a large amount of dishonesty and fraud. Administrators were able to pocket money or use it for other purposes with very little judicial oversight. Many debtors were not able to be released from their creditors even after their cases had been filed. In addition, many bankrupt individuals hid different assets that they owned to keep them from being taken or used to pay back the money that they owed. Those who were not eligible had no chance to work off the money, and even those who were eligible had to hope that their creditor would file the case and be willing to forgive the debt. In totality, many people were further thrust into debt, and the act did not serve the purpose of lowering economic failure for the nation. As a result, Congress repealed the act in 1803, two years before it expired.

See also
 History of bankruptcy law in the United States
 Bankruptcy in the United States

References

External links
Original text of the bill from the Library of Congress.

United States bankruptcy legislation
1800 in American law
History of bankruptcy law
Repealed United States legislation